A feature story is a piece of non-fiction writing about news.  A feature story is a type of soft news.  The main sub-types are the news feature and the human-interest story.

A feature story is distinguished from other types of non-news by the quality of the writing. Stories should be memorable for their reporting, crafting, creativity, and economy of expression.

Style 
A feature story, as contrasted with straight news reporting, normally presents newsworthy events and information through a narrative story, complete with a plot and story characters.  It differs from a short story primarily in that the content is not fictional.  Like literature, the feature story relies upon creativity and subjectivity to make an emotional connection with the readers and may highlight some universal aspect of human nature.  Unlike straight news, the feature story serves the purpose of entertaining the readers, in addition to informing them. Although truthful and based on good facts, they are less objective than straight news.

Unlike straight news, the subject of a feature story is usually not time sensitive.  It generally features good news.

Feature stories are usually written in an active style, with an emphasis on lively, entertaining prose.  Some forms, such as a color story, uses description as the main mode.

Published features and news
Feature stories are stories with only one feature, but are creative and true. While the distinction between published features and news is often clear, when approached conceptually there are few hard boundaries between the two. It is quite possible to write a feature story in the style of a news story. Nevertheless, features do tend to take a more narrative approach, perhaps using opening paragraphs as scene-setting narrative hooks instead of the delivery of the most important facts. A feature story can be in a news article, a newspaper, and even online.

Types
The feature is one of the most wide-ranging categories of journalism. In The Universal Journalist, David Randall suggests several categories of feature, including fly on the wall, interview, profile, analysis, and review. Among sports writers, feature stories tend to be either human-interest stories or personality profiles of sports figures.  A profile presents information about a person, but it differs from a biography by focusing on the person's personality or anecdotes, rather than the factual data about birth, education, or major achievements.

See also

Documentary film
Radio documentary
Dictionary
Language Arts
Journalism
Plot
Setting
Story
Human interest story
Evergreen content

References

Further reading
 Garrison, Bruce: Professional Feature Writing. Routledge, 5th edition 2009. 

Journalism terminology
Newswriting